Halbach may refer to:

Arnold Halbach (1787–1869), Prussian diplomat
Edward A. Halbach (1909–2011), American amateur astronomer
Klaus Halbach (1925-2000), German-born American particle physicist and inventor of the Halbach Array in the 1980s
Alfried Krupp von Bohlen und Halbach (1907–1967), German steel entrepreneur